Luke Watson (born August 20, 1980) is a retired long-distance runner who specialized in various track and road running disciplines. He represented the United States at the IAAF World Cross Country Championships in 2004 and 2006. He was a member of one of the greatest generations of high school long distance runners in the US, many of whom happened to be from Stillwater High in the late 1990s. At Notre Dame he studied and also became a very competitive middle and long distance runner, before which he ran at three US Olympic Trials in 2004, 2008, and 2012. Watson retired from competitive running in 2012. He is the older brother of Jake Watson.  Following his running career, Watson earned a PhD in accounting from Pennsylvania State University, and is an assistant accounting professor at Villanova University.  Watson specializes in corporate tax accounting research.

Running career

High school
He attended Stillwater Area High School, whose coach Scott Christensen contributed to a handful of elite distance runners' careers. Watson competed for the school's cross country and track teams among an exceptional generation of distance runners, which included Sean Graham who was born in the same year as Watson was. Many years later, Watson and Graham would compete against each other in the 5000-meter race at the 2004 Olympic Trials. In 1997 the Stillwater cross country team was ranked number one in the United States. Stillwater would become the only high school track team whose alumni produced more than three sub-four minute mile runners, who all happened to have been coached in high school by cross country and track coach Christensen before he became a science teacher at the same school. In addition to cross country and track, Watson participated in nordic skiing during high school.

Collegiate
Watson attended Notre Dame and also ran for their cross country and track teams. Among his teammates at Notre Dame was Ryan Shay, who Watson posthumously thanked in a retirement message for his contribution to Watson's development. By his senior year, Watson and Shay were called "one of the best cross-country lead runner combinations in the nation".

Post-collegiate
Watson ran the men's short race at the 2004 IAAF World Cross Country Championships, placing 36th out of 139 finishers. Just months later, he ran the 5000 meters at the 2004 US Olympic Trials, running a time of 13:45.53 (min:sec) in the preliminary round, and then running a time of 13:53.49 in the final round, placing 14th out of 16 competitors, a few seconds behind high school teammate Sean Graham who also did not qualify for the Olympics. He then ran the men's short race at the 2006 IAAF World Cross Country Championships, this time placing 57th of 126 finishers. At the 2008 Olympic Trials, he ran the 3000-m steeplechase, but did not make it past the preliminary round. Finally, Watson ran the marathon at the 2012 Olympic Trials, running a time of 2:15:29.

References

1980 births
Living people
American male long-distance runners
American male steeplechase runners
Notre Dame Fighting Irish men's track and field athletes
Notre Dame Fighting Irish men's cross country runners